Darreh or Dorreh or Dareh or Derreh may refer to:
 Dareh, Fars
 Darreh, Isfahan
 Darreh, Kerman
 Darreh, Kurdistan
 Darreh, Markazi
 Darreh, alternate name of Darreh Garm, Markazi
 Darreh, South Khorasan
 Darreh, Yazd
 Darreh, alternate name of Manshad, Yazd Province

See also